Alan Markham is an Irish sportsperson.  He plays hurling with his local club Kilmaley and was a former member of the Clare senior inter-county team.

References

Living people
Clare inter-county hurlers
Kilmaley hurlers
Year of birth missing (living people)